The 2016 European Judo Championships were held in Kazan, Russia, between 21–24 April 2016.

Medal overview

Men

Women

Medal table

References

External links
 

 Results
 Team results

 
European Judo Championships
Judo, European Championships
European Championships
Judo, 2016 European Championships
Judo, 2016 European Championships
Judo, 2016 European Championships
Judo competitions in Russia
Judo, European Championships